Bobota is a commune located in Sălaj County, Crișana, Romania. It is composed of three villages: Bobota, Derșida (Kisderzsida) and Zalnoc (Zálnok).

Sights 
 Wooden Church, Derșida, built in the 18th century, historic monument
 Wooden Church, Zalnoc, built in the 17th century, historic monument

Natives
Corneliu Coposu
Clara Maniu

References

Communes in Sălaj County
Localities in Crișana